Manfred Hofer (born 15 June 1935) is an Austrian bobsledder. He competed in the four-man event at the 1968 Winter Olympics.

References

1935 births
Living people
Austrian male bobsledders
Olympic bobsledders of Austria
Bobsledders at the 1968 Winter Olympics
People from Dornbirn
Sportspeople from Vorarlberg